Feruza Jumaniyozova is an Uzbek pop singer who sings in Uzbek and Tajik. She was born in 1984 in Khorezm province of Uzbekistan. Some of her top songs are "Vaexo", "Yalla Habibi", "Yurak Duk Duk" and "Kel Azizim". She got married in October 2010.

Filmography

Actress

Music videos

References

External links
 » Скачать музыку бесплатно новинки музыки 2022 

20th-century Uzbekistani women singers
Living people
1984 births
Tajik-language singers
People from Xorazm Region